A History of the Book in America is a five-volume series of scholarly books of essays published 2000–2010 by the University of North Carolina Press, and edited by David D. Hall. Topics include printing, publishing, book selling, reading, and other aspects of print culture in colonial America and the United States. Among the contributing writers: Hugh Amory, Georgia B. Barnhill, Paul S. Boyer, Richard D. Brown, Scott E. Casper, Charles E. Clark, James P. Danky, Ann Fabian, James N. Green, Robert A. Gross, Jeffrey D. Groves, David D. Hall, Mary Kelley, E. Jennifer Monaghan, Janice Radway, James Raven, Elizabeth Carroll Reilly, Joan Shelley Rubin, Michael Schudson, David S. Shields, Wayne A. Wiegand, Michael Winship.

Volumes

See also
 Books in the United States
 History of the book

References

2000 non-fiction books
2007 non-fiction books
2009 non-fiction books
2010 non-fiction books
American history books
21st-century history books
Books about books
History of books
Printing in the United States
Publishing in the United States
Series of history books